Zola Nombona (born 10 March 1992), is a South African actress best known for her role as Shado, a streetwise teenager, in the second season of the SABC 1 drama series Intersexions in 2013.

Education
She went to Victoria Girls' High School, Grahamstown, before achieving a bachelor and an honours degree in dramatic arts at the University of the Witwatersrand.

Career
Nombona's first major role was on a drama series Intersexions based on HIV/Aids on SABC 1 in 2013.

In 2015, she had her first starring role as Roxanne in the e.tv drama Zbondiwe.

She also starred as Monde on Lockdown, a television drama series set in a fictional high security prison for women. She played the role of Zee in the movie-turned-drama series Inumber Number.

Filmography

Television

References

External links
 

1992 births
South African actresses
Living people
University of the Witwatersrand alumni